Kevin Reynolds may refer to:

Kevin Reynolds (director) (born 1952)
Kevin Reynolds (figure skater) (born 1990)
Kevin Reynolds (priest) (active 2011)
Kevin Reynolds (unionist) (active 1970s–present)

See also
Kev Reynolds (1943-2021), English outdoor writer
Kevin McReynolds (born 1959), American baseball player